Erin M. K. Weir (born 1982) is a Canadian politician from Saskatchewan. From 2015 until 2019, he was Member of Parliament for the riding of Regina—Lewvan. Weir initially sat as a member of the federal New Democratic Party (NDP) but was expelled from the party's caucus on May 3, 2018 after a third party investigation sustained three claims of sexual harassment. Before entering federal politics, Weir ran in the 2013 Saskatchewan New Democratic Party leadership election and was an economist with the Canadian section of the United Steelworkers union.

Prior to his expulsion, Weir was appointed the NDP's critic for Public Services and Procurement Canada.

Early life and career

Weir was born in 1982 in Saskatoon, Saskatchewan. Weir holds three university degrees: a Bachelor of Arts from the University of Regina, a Master of Arts from the University of Calgary, and a Master of Public Administration from Queen's University.

In May 2012 while Weir was an economist working with the United Steelworkers and presenting in front of the Parliamentary Finance committee, he was questioned by Conservative MP Randy Hoback – who asked "Are you now, or have you ever been, a member of the NDP party[sic]". CBC and Maclean's made comparisons to McCarthyism based on this line of questioning from Hoback.

Political career 
In 2004, Weir ran in the federal riding of Wascana against Liberal finance minister Ralph Goodale as the New Democratic Party's candidate, but was defeated.

2013 Saskatchewan New Democratic Party leadership election

In June 2012 a group of Canadian economists sent a public letter calling on Erin Weir to enter the 2013 Saskatchewan New Democratic Party leadership election. Also a group of notable New Democrats including former NDP MP Dick Proctor and former NDP premier Howard Pawley of Manitoba created a "Committee to Draft Erin Weir".

On September 7, 2012 Weir, then aged 30, announced he was entering the race. He addressed the issue of his not having a seat by saying "I would see it advantageous as having a leader that is not tied down to Regina all the time and free to tour the province." He also made the comparison to Jack Layton and the federal NDP of the time. Earlier that week, he had addressed his age saying the age of the candidate should not be the focus of voters and that "Public policy is more important,".

He was one of four declared candidates including MLA Cam Broten, doctor Ryan Meili, and MLA Trent Wotherspoon.

His campaign was described by the media as organized and one of the main political commentators in the province said the race was "highly competitive" and "The fact they could all win is probably incentive for all four to run."

On February 20, 2013, Weir withdrew from the leadership race and endorsed fellow candidate Ryan Meili.

Federal politics 
On April 11, 2014, Weir announced that he was seeking the NDP nomination in the new federal riding of Regina—Lewvan. He was nominated on June 22, 2014, defeating former 2011 Palliser federal NDP candidate Noah Evanchuk. He was elected on October 19, 2015, prevailing over Conservative candidate Trent Fraser by 132 votes according to the results validated by the Returning Officer. Fraser initially requested a recount, but the request was later withdrawn.

Weir was appointed the party's critic for Public Services and Procurement Canada in November 2015. He was also appointed as the Vice-Chair of the Standing Committee on Government Operations and Estimates in December 2015.

After the federal government announced a pan-Canadian price on carbon, Weir called for border adjustments to that pricing, pointing out that different carbon prices between countries can result in "carbon leakage". Weir's proposal was eventually adopted by Peter Julian, during his campaign for federal NDP Leader. Weir was one of the first MPs to raise the issue of problems with the new federal payroll system called Phoenix. Civilian employees at the RCMP's "Depot" Division living in his riding brought them to his attention.

Harassment allegations 
In February 2018, Weir was suspended from his caucus duties by party leader Jagmeet Singh pending an independent investigation made into sexual harassment allegations made against him. Weir was expelled from the NDP caucus on May 3, 2018 following his public comments to the media regarding the outcome of the sexual harassment investigation, and for revealing confidential information about a complainant. The investigation found that one claim of harassment and three claims of sexual harassment were sustained by the evidence. As an independent member, Weir asked Speaker Geoff Regan to have his affiliation switched to the Co-operative Commonwealth Federation (CCF), the predecessor of the modern NDP. As the House of Commons does not require that a party be registered with Elections Canada for the purposes of MPs declaring affiliation, the affiliation change was accepted and Weir became the first CCF MP since 1961.

In May 2018, a group of 67 former NDP MPs and MLAs from Saskatchewan sent Singh a letter in support of Weir and calling for his reinstatement as an NDP MP.

On September 6, 2018, it was publicly revealed that NDP Leader Singh had rejected Weir's request to rejoin the NDP during a meeting in June, despite Weir stating that he had worked with a personal trainer to understand the issues of the complaint.

Singh also said that Weir will not be permitted to run as an NDP candidate in the 2019 federal election. Although Weir had announced that he intended to seek the party's nomination in Regina—Lewvan, he retracted that statement, citing NDP Leader Singh's continued refusal for Weir to run for the party's nomination without appeal.

On May 21, 2019, Weir announced he would not run for reelection.

Electoral record

Notes

References

External links
 

Canadian economists
Living people
Members of the House of Commons of Canada from Saskatchewan
Saskatchewan New Democratic Party politicians
Politicians from Regina, Saskatchewan
Politicians from Saskatoon
New Democratic Party MPs
1982 births
University of Regina alumni
University of Calgary alumni
Queen's University at Kingston alumni
21st-century Canadian politicians
Independent MPs in the Canadian House of Commons
Politicians affected by a party expulsion process